A new sophisticated point-of-sale or memory-scraping malware called "Multigrain"  was discovered on April 17, 2016 by the FireEye Inc.  security company. Multigrain malware comes under the family of NewposThings Malware. This malware is similar to the NewposThings, FrameworkPOS and BernhardPOS malware which were known previously as notorious malware.

Process of Multigrain malware

Multigrain uses the Luhn algorithm to validate the credit and debit card details. This POS malware then infects the computer and blocks Hypertext Transfer Protocol (http) and file transfer protocol (ftp) traffic which monitors the data exfiltration. It exfiltrates the scraped information of credit and debit card via Domain Name Server (DNS). Then it sends the collected payment card information to a 'command and control server' server.

Targets one POS platform

Multigrain targets specifically the Windows point of sale system, which has a multi.exe executable file. If  Multigrain gets into a POS system that does not have multi.exe then it deletes itself without leaving any trace.

See also
Point-of-sale malware
 Cyber electronic warfare
 List of cyber attack threat trends
 Malware
 Cyber security standards

References

Cyberwarfare
Windows trojans
Carding (fraud)